Marla Graff Decker (born May 31, 1958) is Chief Judge of the Court of Appeals of Virginia. She was appointed as a judge of the Court on October 1, 2013 by Governor Bob McDonnell and took office a month later. From 2010 until her swearing in as a judge, she was the Secretary of Public Safety in Governor McDonnell's cabinet. Judge Graff was elected to a four-year term Chief Judge of the Court in 2019, succeeding Judge Glen A. Huff.  Because Chief Judge Graff's term expires in 2021, she will need to be reappointed to the Court by the General Assembly, which is now controlled by the Democratic Party, in order to complete her term as Chief Judge.

References

Living people
Judges of the Court of Appeals of Virginia
State cabinet secretaries of Virginia
Gettysburg College alumni
University of Richmond School of Law alumni
1958 births
21st-century American judges
21st-century American women judges